Mike Seamon (August 30, 1988 in Rahway, New Jersey) is an American soccer player.

Career

College
Seamon was born in New Jersey and attended Union Catholic Regional High School.

He played four years of college soccer at Villanova University. His freshman year, he led his team with 5 assists. In his second season with the Wildcats, he was named the Philadelphia Soccer Seven Player of the Year and was also awarded second team All-Big East. During his Junior year of college, he was voted third team ALL-BIG EAST and scored 4 goals and made 4 assists.

Professional
Seamon was drafted in the second round (27th overall) of the 2010 MLS SuperDraft by Seattle Sounders FC.

On June 2, 2010 it was announced that he had been signed by Seattle Sounders FC.  He made his professional debut on June 27, in a 3-1 road defeat against the Philadelphia Union.

Seamon remained with Seattle through the 2012 season. After the conclusion of the 2012 season, the club declined the 2013 option on Seamon's contract and he entered the 2012 MLS Re-Entry Draft. Seamon became a free agent after he went undrafted in both rounds of the draft.

It was announced on 13 February 2013 that Seamon signed for the Pittsburgh Riverhounds. Seamon made his first appearance for the club as a starter during the Riverhounds' opening match of the season against the Richmond Kickers on April 6, 2013.

Honors

Seattle Sounders FC
 Lamar Hunt U.S. Open Cup (2): 2010, 2011

Personal
Mike's sister, Katie Seamon, was on Season 17 of CBS's The Amazing Race with partner Rachel. They were the 4th team eliminated from the race.

Career statistics

Statistics accurate as of August 18, 2012.

References

External links
 

1988 births
Living people
American soccer players
Villanova Wildcats men's soccer players
Seattle Sounders FC players
Pittsburgh Riverhounds SC players
Soccer players from New Jersey
Sportspeople from Rahway, New Jersey
Seattle Sounders FC draft picks
Union Catholic Regional High School alumni
Major League Soccer players
USL Championship players
Association football midfielders